Penumaka is a part of Mangalagiri Tadepalle Municipal Corporation part of Guntur district which is part of Andhra Pradesh. It was a village in Tadepalle mandal of Guntur district, prior to its de–notification as gram panchayat.

Demographics 
The average literacy rate was 71.11%.

Government and politics 

Penumaka gram panchayat is the local self-government of the village. It is divided into wards and each ward is represented by a ward member. The ward members are headed by a Sarpanch. The village forms a part of capital city, Andhra Pradesh Capital Region and is under the jurisdiction of APCRDA.

Transport 
Penumaka is located on the Vijayawada-Amaravati road. APSRTC operates buses on this route from Pandit Nehru bus station in Vijayawada.

See also 
List of villages in Guntur district

References 

Neighbourhoods in Amaravati